The Rift, also known as Endless Descent, is a 1990 film directed by Juan Piquer Simón and starring R. Lee Ermey. The story involves a submarine rescue that goes awry. It is one of many underwater-themed movies released around 1990, including The Abyss, Leviathan, DeepStar Six, The Evil Below, ‘’Hunt for Red October’’ and Lords of the Deep.

Synopsis
An experimental submarine, the "Siren II", with an experienced NATO crew is sent to find out what happened to the missing "Siren I". The designer of the sub blames the Contek corporation's modifications to his original design. The Siren II is captained by experienced officer Captain Randolph Phillips.

The Siren II traces the Siren I's black box to an underwater rift. They are surrounded by a toxic weed, although an on-board scientist says plant life at this depth is impossible. The Siren II escapes the weed by reversing the polarity of the hull, although some of the weed gets into the sub.

Later, they surface in a cave system where they discover that Contek has been engaged in illegal genetic engineering experiments that have produced a variety of mutant creatures.

Cast
 Jack Scalia as Wick Hayes
 R. Lee Ermey as Capt. Randall Phillips
 Ray Wise as H. Robbins
 Deborah Adair as Lt. Nina Crowley
 John Toles Bey as Joe "Skeets" Kane
 Ely Pouget as Ana Rivera
 Emilio Linder as Philippe Huppert
 Tony Isbert as Roger Fleming
 Álvaro Labra as Dr. Carlo Camerini
 Luis Lorenzo as Francisco Grau
 Frank Braña as H. Mueller
 Pocholo Martínez-Bordiú as Sven Holst (as J. Martinez Bordiu)
 Edmund Purdom as CEO Steensland
 Garrick Hagon as Barton (as Garick Hagon)
 James Aubrey as Contek 1
 Derrick Vopelka as Contek 2
 Jed Downey as Tony Garner (Man on Tapes)

Reception
The Rift is considered a "B" movie. Reviewers noted the lack of originality in its plot, but praised the film for providing action-packed entertainment on a limited budget.

Moria gave the picture one (out of a possible five) stars: "R. Lee Ermey gives a likeable performance, but the script is unfocused; the motives of the conglomerate funding the expedition are unclear; and the climax is unsatisfying."

Brandon's Cult Movie Reviews called the film a "decent" one.

Creature Feature gave the movie two (out of a possible five) stars, finding it to be "an ineffective Aliens knock-off."

Den of Geek found the picture to be "entertaining."

Movie historian Leonard Maltin declared the film a "BOMB", stating that "...Anybody who sticks around for the climax ought to be decorated for their trouble...As usual, R. Lee Ermey acts circles around most of his co-stars; but, ultimately, even he cannot sell this bill of goods."

Home Release
The film was released on Region 1 Blu-ray in 2016.

References

External links

 
 

1990 films
1990 science fiction films
1990s English-language films
English-language Spanish films
Films scored by Joel Goldsmith
Films directed by Juan Piquer Simon
Films shot in Madrid
Science fiction submarine films
Spanish science fiction films
American science fiction films
1990s American films
1990s Spanish films